KKEN 97.1 FM is a radio station licensed to Duncan, Oklahoma.  The station broadcasts a country music format and is owned by Mollman Media, Inc.

References

External links
KKEN's official website

KEN
Country radio stations in the United States